Emeril is an unincorporated community in the Canadian province of Newfoundland and Labrador.

It is a sparsely populated area located around 50 km northeast of Labrador City on the Trans-Labrador Highway and serves as an intermediate stop on Tshiuetin Rail Transportation's train from Sept-Îles, Quebec to Schefferville.

See also 
 List of communities in Newfoundland and Labrador

References

 Atlas of Canada – Information on Emeril, Newfoundland and Labrador

Geography of Newfoundland and Labrador